The Museum of Medical Humanities of National Taiwan University (NTU) is a museum about medical humanities at the NTU College of Medicine campus in Zhongzheng District, Taipei, Taiwan.

History
The museum was opened on 21 February 1998.

Exhibitions
The museum regularly holds special medical and cultural exhibitions, demonstrating the contribution of the college to medical development in various fields in Taiwan. It also provides teachers with educational and research information relating to medical humanities.

Transportation
The museum is accessible within walking distance east from NTU Hospital Station of the Taipei Metro.

See also
 List of museums in Taiwan
 National Taiwan University
 Healthcare in Taiwan

References

External links

 

1998 establishments in Taiwan
Museums established in 1998
Medical museums in Taiwan
University museums in Taiwan
Hospital museums
Museums in Taipei
National Taiwan University